Uchuy Milla (possibly from Quechua huch'uy (in Bolivia juch'uy) little, milla instep,) is a mountain in the Vilcanota mountain range in the Andes of Peru, about  high. It is located in the Cusco Region, Canchis Province, Pitumarca District, northwest of Sibinacocha. It lies south of the peak of Pajo.

References

Mountains of Cusco Region
Mountains of Peru